Yinan may refer to:

Yinan County, in Shandong, China
Zhenzhu Khan (died 645), personal name Yi'nan (夷男), khan of Xueyantuo
Diao Yinan (born 1969), Chinese director, screenwriter, and actor
Wang Yinan (born 1989), Chinese swimmer